Zane McIntyre (né Gothberg; born August 20, 1992) is an American professional ice hockey goaltender who is currently playing with the Iowa Wild of the American Hockey League (AHL) while under contract to the Minnesota Wild of the National Hockey League (NHL). McIntyre was selected by the Boston Bruins in the sixth round (165th overall) of the 2010 NHL Entry Draft.

Playing career
McIntyre came to the University of North Dakota after playing junior hockey in the United States Hockey League (USHL) with the Fargo Force where he was named the 2011–12 USHL Goaltender of the Year. McIntyre committed to play collegiate hockey with NCAA Division I University of North Dakota men's ice hockey team which competes in the National Collegiate Hockey Conference (NCHC) conference.

After his junior season with North Dakota in 2014–15 season, McIntyre turned pro in agreeing to a two-year entry-level contract with the Boston Bruins on June 23, 2015.

Partly due to Bruins primary goaltender Tuukka Rask sustaining a groin injury at the season's start, on October 25, 2016, McIntyre made his NHL debut in a 5–0 loss to the Minnesota Wild. The following night, on October 26, he was the starting goaltender for the Bruins in a 5–2 loss to the New York Rangers. On July 14, 2017, during the off-season McIntyre, along with fellow Providence Bruins goaltender Malcolm Subban, were each re-signed by the Boston Bruins for two years, at $650,000 per year.

After spending his first four professional seasons within the Bruins organization, McIntyre left as a free agent to sign a one-year, two-way contract with the Vancouver Canucks on July 1, 2019. McIntyre was assigned by the Canucks to begin the 2019–20 season with AHL affiliate, the Utica Comets. In sharing the starting duties with prospect Michael DiPietro, McIntyre posted 11 wins 24 games. He was briefly recalled by the Canucks however did not feature in a game.

On February 24, 2020, McIntyre was traded by the Canucks at the NHL trade deadline to the New Jersey Devils in exchange for fellow goaltender Louis Domingue. He was immediately assigned to join the Binghamton Devils of the AHL.

On October 26, 2020, McIntyre left North America as a free agent and signed abroad for the first time in his professional career, agreeing to a contract with Latvian-based club, Dinamo Riga of the Kontinental Hockey League (KHL). McIntyre made most of his 6 appearances in relief with Dinamo, registering 2 losses, before he mutually terminated his contract and returned to North America. Having remained un-signed as the 2020–21 season was delayed due to the ongoing pandemic. He was signed to a professional tryout contract to join the Arizona Coyotes training camp on December 27, 2020.

Following his release by the Coyotes at the conclusion of camp, McIntyre agreed to a one-year AHL contract with the Lehigh Valley Phantoms, affiliate to the Philadelphia Flyers, on January 18, 2021.

As an un-signed free agent a month into the 2021–22 season, McIntyre signed a professional tryout contract with the Tucson Roadrunners, the AHL affiliate of the Arizona Coyotes, on November 1, 2021. He collected 2 wins in 3 appearances with the Roadrunners before he was released from his tryout after securing a one-year, two-way contract with the Minnesota Wild on January 4, 2022. He was reassigned to continue his season in the AHL with affiliate, the Iowa Wild.

Career statistics

Awards and honors

References

External links
 

1992 births
Living people
AHCA Division I men's ice hockey All-Americans
American men's ice hockey goaltenders
Atlanta Gladiators players
Binghamton Devils players
Boston Bruins draft picks
Boston Bruins players
Dinamo Riga players
Fargo Force players
Ice hockey people from North Dakota
Iowa Wild players
Lehigh Valley Phantoms players
North Dakota Fighting Hawks men's ice hockey players
Providence Bruins players
People from Thief River Falls, Minnesota
Sportspeople from Grand Forks, North Dakota
Tucson Roadrunners players
Utica Comets players